RO-4491533 is a drug developed by Hoffmann-La Roche which acts as a potent and selective negative allosteric modulator for group II of the metabotropic glutamate receptors (mGluR2/3), being equipotent at mGluR2 and  mGluR3 but without activity at other mGluR subtypes. In animal studies, RO-4491533 produced antidepressant effects and reversed the effects of the mGluR2/3 agonist LY-379,268 with similar efficacy but slightly lower potency than the mGluR2/3 antagonist LY-341,495. A number of related compounds are known, with similar effects in vitro and a fairly well characterized structure-activity relationship.

See also 
 Decoglurant

References 

MGlu2 receptor antagonists
MGlu3 receptor antagonists
Trifluoromethyl compounds
Benzodiazepines